The Makassaric languages are a group of languages spoken in the southern part of South Sulawesi province, Indonesia, and make up one of the branches of the South Sulawesi subgroup in the Austronesian language family. The most prominent member of this group is Makassarese, with over two million speakers in the city of Makassar and neighboring areas.

The status of the Makassaric languages other than Makassarese as distinct languages is not universally accepted. In older classifications, but also in recent studies by local linguists, they are considered to be dialects of the Makassarese language.

Languages

Makassarese
Bentong
Coastal Konjo
Highland Konjo
Selayar

Phonology

E.g. This echo vowel is dropped if a suffix is added, but retained if followed by an enclitic.

References

External links
 Makassar languages at Ethnologue (23rd ed., 2020).

Languages of Sulawesi
South Sulawesi languages